This is a timeline documenting the events of heavy metal in the year 2004.

Newly formed bands
A Dozen Furies
A Hero A Fake
Abigail Williams
Adept
After The Burial
Age of Silence
The Agonist (as The Tempest)
Ahab 
Alestorm 
Alter Bridge
Amaseffer
Amesoeurs
Architects 
Art of Dying
Baptized In Blood
Be'lakor
Beneath The Massacre
Beneath the Sky
Big Business 
Binary Code
Black Tide
Black Mountain
Blackthorn
Blood Tsunami
Bloodbound 
Bring Me the Horizon 
Catalepsy
Celestiial
Cellador
Chrome Division
Claim the Throne
Cor Scorpii
Dark Empire
Dead Congregation
Devil Sold His Soul
Enforcer 
Escape the Fate
The Faceless
Finsterforst
Genghis Tron
Gnaw Their Tongues
Havok 
The Human Abstract
Imperia
Intronaut
Lich King
Massacration
myGRAIN
Royal Thunder
Russian Circles
Savage Circus
Saving Abel
Scale the Summit
Scar Symmetry
Skiltron
Sturm und Drang
To-Mera
Torche 
Tribulation  
Triosphere
Veil of Maya  
Vreid
Warbringer
Wolfmother

Reformed bands
 Extreme (for a few shows)
 Glyder
 Megadeth
 Mötley Crüe

Albums

 3 Inches of Blood – Advance and Vanquish
 36 Crazyfists – A Snow Capped Romance
 The Acacia Strain – 3750
 Aerosmith – Honkin' on Bobo
 After Forever – Invisible Circles
 Age of Silence – Acceleration
 Alabama Thunderpussy – Fulton Hill
 All That Remains - This Darkened Heart
 Alter Bridge – One Day Remains
 Amon Amarth – Fate of Norns
 Angra – Temple of Shadows
 Anvil – Back to Basics
 Atreyu - The Curse
 Ayreon – The Human Equation
 Behemoth – Demigod
 Beseech – Drama
 Black Label Society – Hangover Music Vol. VI
 Bon Jovi – 100,000,000 Bon Jovi Fans Can't Be Wrong (box set)
 Breaking Benjamin – We Are Not Alone
 Cannibal Corpse – The Wretched Spawn
 The Chariot – Everything Is Alive, Everything Is Breathing, Nothing Is Dead, and Nothing Is Bleeding
 Chevelle – This Type of Thinking (Could Do Us In)
 Cradle of Filth – Nymphetamine
 Damageplan – New Found Power
 Danzig – Circle of Snakes
 Decapitated – The Negation
 Def Leppard – Best of Def Leppard (compilation)
 Deicide – Scars of the Crucifix
 Demon Hunter – Summer of Darkness
 The Dillinger Escape Plan – Miss Machine
 Dio – Master of the Moon
 Dokken – Hell to Pay
 Downset. – Universal
 DragonForce – Sonic Firestorm
 Dream Evil – The Book of Heavy Metal
 Dream Theater – Live at Budokan (live)
 Drowning Pool – Desensitized
 Edguy – Hellfire Club
 Electric Wizard – We Live
 Enslaved - Isa
 Exodus – Tempo of the Damned
 Fates Warning – FWX
 Fear Factory – Archetype
 Finntroll – Nattfödd
 God Forbid – Gone Forever
 Grip Inc. – Incorporated
 Gwar – War Party
 Heaven Shall Burn – Antigone
 Helmet - Size Matters
 Helmet - Unsung: The Best of Helmet (1991-1997) (compilation)
 Hirax - The New Age of Terror
 Hypocrisy – The Arrival
 Iced Earth – The Glorious Burden
 In Flames – Soundtrack to Your Escape
 Isis – Panopticon
 Jag Panzer – Casting the Stones
 Killswitch Engage – The End of Heartache
 Kittie – Until the End
 Kill the Noize – Play with the Devil
 Kronos – Colossal Titan Strife
 Lamb of God – Ashes of the Wake
 Lordi – The Monsterican Dream
 Marilyn Manson – Lest We Forget: The Best Of (compilation)
 Marduk - Plague Angel
 Mastodon – Leviathan
 Mayhem – Chimera
 Megadeth – The System Has Failed
 Mercenary – 11 Dreams
 Meshuggah – I
 Metal Church – The Weight of the World
 Metalium – As One – Chapter Four
 Ministry – Houses of the Molé
 Misanthrope - Misanthro-Thérapie (15 Années d'Analyse) (compilation)
 Mnemic – The Audio Injected Soul
 Monster Magnet – Monolithic Baby!
 Motörhead – Inferno
 My Dying Bride – Songs of Darkness, Words of Light
 Necrophagist – Epitaph
 Neurosis – The Eye of Every Storm
 Nightwish – Once
 No-Big-Silence – Kuidas kuningas kuu peale kippus
 Oomph! – Wahrheit oder Pflicht
 Orange Goblin – Thieving from the House of God
 Otep – House of Secrets
 Papa Roach – Getting Away with Murder
 Pentagram - Show 'Em How
 Pig Destroyer – Painter of Dead Girls (compilation)
 Pig Destroyer – Terrifyer
 Power Quest – Neverworld
 Primal Fear – Devil's Ground
 Pro-Pain – Fistful of Hate
 Probot – Probot
 Rammstein – Reise, Reise
 Raunchy – Confusion Bay
 Rhapsody – Symphony of Enchanted Lands II – The Dark Secret
 Rotting Christ - Sanctus Diavolos
 Saxon – Lionheart
 Senses Fail – Let It Enfold You
 Scarve – Irradiant
 Scorpions – Unbreakable
 Shadows Fall – The War Within
 Slipknot – Vol. 3: (The Subliminal Verses)
 Sonata Arctica – Reckoning Night
 Soulfly – Prophecy
 Static-X – Beneath... Between... Beyond... (compilation)
 Stryper – 7 Weeks: Live in America, 2003 (live)
 Suffocation – Souls to Deny
 Terror – One with the Underdogs
 The Crest – Vain City Chronicles
 The Haunted – Revolver
 Therion - Lemuria
 Therion - Sirius B
 U.D.O. – Thunderball
 Underoath – They're Only Chasing Safety
 Unearth – The Oncoming Storm
 Vader – The Beast
 Van Halen – The Best of Both Worlds (compilation)
 Velvet Revolver – Contraband
 Vintersorg – The Focusing Blur
 Visions of Atlantis – Cast Away
 WarCry – Alea Jacta Est
 Winds – The Imaginary Direction of Time
 Wintersun – Wintersun
 Within Temptation – The Silent Force
 Xandria – Ravenheart

Disbandments
 Bathory
 Creed
 Damageplan
 Nothingface (reformed in 2005)
 Prayer for Cleansing
 SugarComa
 Windir

Events
Terje Bakken of Windir dies from hypothermia on his way to his grandparents, which resulted in Windir disbanding.
Brian Welch leaves Korn after converting to Christianity.
 Damageplan and former Pantera guitarist Dimebag Darrell is murdered on stage while performing at a nightclub in Ohio on 8 December.
 Bassist Tim Gaines leaves Stryper after 10 complete years.  He is replaced by Tracy Ferrie.
 Body Count rhythm guitarist D-Roc dies from lymphoma at the age of 45.
 Jason Jones, originally a tattoo artist from Los Angeles, California, was publicly announced as Drowning Pool's new lead singer and joined them on the album Desensitized.
 Supergroup Velvet Revolver releases their debut album Contraband which debuts at No. 1 on the Billboard 200 and goes double platinum.
After an eight-year hiatus, Extreme briefly returns for a short tour and a few concerts in Japan.
Van Halen reunites with Sammy Hagar for a summer tour.
Anal Cunt vocalist Seth Putnam slips into a coma after consuming a large amount of drugs.
Aerosmith returns to a raw hard rock sound with their blues cover album Honkin' on Bobo
 Terry Balsamo leaves Cold and joins Evanescence as their new guitarist.
 Guitarist Lisa Marx joins Kittie as a session member, replacing Jeff Phillips.
 Nasum guitarist/vocalist Mieszko Talarczyk dies as a result of the 2004 Indian Ocean earthquake (although his body was not identified until 17 February the following year). Consequently, Nasum would later disband.
Maniac leaves Mayhem and is replaced by the band's former singer, Attila Csihar.
 Ace Thomas "Quorthon" Forsberg, founder of the Black/Viking metal band Bathory dies, at the age of 38.
 Dave Mustaine reforms Megadeth with 3 session musicians, former and original Megadeth guitarist Chris Poland, bassist Jimmie Lee Sloas and drummer Vinnie Colaiuta to record The System Has Failed, then tour the album with full-time members Glen Drover on guitar, James MacDonough on bass and Shawn Drover on drums.
 Ex-Judas Priest drummer Dave Holland is sentenced to eight years in prison for attempted rape against a then 17-year-old boy.

References

2000s in heavy metal music
Metal